Alberto De Martino (12 June 1929 – 2 June 2015) was an Italian film director and screenwriter. Born in Rome, De Martino started as a child actor and later returned to the cinema where worked as a screenwriter, director and dubbing supervisor. De Martino's films as a director specialised in well-crafted knock-offs of Hollywood hit films. These films were specifically created films in Western, horror and mythology genres which were developed for the international market. The Telegraph stated that his best known of these film was probably The Antichrist. The Antichrist capitalized on the box-office appeal of The Exorcist (1973) and in its first week in the United States earned a greater box office than Jaws.

Life and career
Alberto De Martino was born on 12 June 1929 in Rome.  De Martino was the son of a film make-up artist. He started his career as a child actor. 

On attending University, De Martino studied law. Martino returned to a career in cinema working as an editor, screenwriter and as an assistant director. Martino stated he was encouraged to be a director by Federico Fellini for whom he supervised the dubbing for La Dolce Vita. De Martino was also very active in the field of dubbing, and he was dubbing director for more than 1,500 films.

De Martino was one of the active directors in the Italian genre cinema between 1960s and mid-1980s; his films spanned different genres, including Spaghetti Western, poliziotteschi, Peplum films and  horror. A real life friend of Sergio Leone, he was second unit director in Duck, You Sucker! He was often credited as Martin Herbert.

In 1980, De Martino nearly lost his home when his film The Pumaman failed at the box office. Pumaman was followed by a few more films concluding his career with Miami Golem.

He died in Rome on 2 June 2015 at the age of 85.

Selected filmography
Note: The films listed as N/A are not necessarily chronological.

References

Footnotes

Sources

External links

1929 births
2015 deaths
Italian film directors
Italian screenwriters
Italian male screenwriters
Writers from Rome
Male actors from Rome
Giallo film directors